The doubles event at the 2009 Andalucia Tennis Experience was won by Klaudia Jans and Alicja Rosolska.

Seeds

Draw

Finals

External links
Draw

Doubles